Saint Boniface (c. 675? – 754), was an important figure in early Christianity.

Saint Boniface, Saint-Boniface or St. Boniface may also refer to:

Other saints 
 Boniface of Brussels (1183–1260)
 Boniface of Tarsus, martyred in 307, according to legend
 Boniface, 5th century African martyr (died 484)
 Bruno of Querfurt (970–1009), also known as Boniface, sainted missionary bishop and martyr, the "Apostle to the Prussians"

Places
 Saint Boniface, Winnipeg, Manitoba, Canada, an historically francophone neighbourhood and former city
 Saint Boniface—Saint Vital, a federal electoral district in Winnipeg containing the area of St. Boniface, formerly called simply "St. Boniface" (1924–1996) and "Saint Boniface" (1996–2013)
 St. Boniface (provincial electoral district), a provincial electoral district containing the northern section of the area of St. Boniface
 The Roman Catholic Archdiocese of Saint Boniface
 Saint-Boniface, Quebec, Canada, a town
 St Boniface Down, a chalk down on the Isle of Wight in the British Isles
 Saint Boniface, Pennsylvania, an unincorporated community in Cambria County

Churches and cathedrals 
 Saint Boniface Cathedral, St. Boniface, Winnipeg, Manitoba, Canada
 St. Boniface Church (disambiguation)

Schools 
 Université de Saint-Boniface, St. Boniface, Winnipeg, a French-language post-secondary institution
 St Boniface College, a secondary school in the Kavango Region of Namibia
 St Boniface's College, a secondary school in Plymouth, Devon, UK
 St Boniface Missionary College, Warminster, Wiltshire, UK, a former Anglican educational institution

Other uses 
 , a Canadian Second World War minesweeper
 St. Boniface General Hospital (Winnipeg), Manitoba, Canada
 St. Boniface College, a fictional Oxbridge college in Pendennis by William Thackeray

See also 
 St. Bonifacius, Minnesota, United States, a city